Prothero is a surname of Welsh origin (from ap Rhydderch) and may refer to:

 Donald Prothero (born 1954), American paleontologist and author
 George Walter Prothero (1848–1922), English writer and historian
 Lewis Prothero, fictional character from V for Vendetta
 Mark Prothero, American attorney
 Mr, Miss, and Mrs Prothero, fictional characters in A Child's Christmas in Wales by Dylan Thomas 
 Rowland Prothero, 1st Baron Ernle (1851–1937), British agricultural expert, administrator, journalist, author, and Conservative politician
 Stephen Prothero, Boston University professor and author
 Thomas Prothero (1780–1853), Welsh lawyer (etc.)
 Brian Protheroe (born 1944), British musician and actor
 Cynbe ru Taren (a.k.a. Jeffrey Prothero), American computer programmer

References

Surnames
Surnames of Welsh origin